The twelfth season of the American animated television series The Simpsons originally aired between November 2000 and May 2001. It began on Wednesday, November 1, 2000 with "Treehouse of Horror XI". The season contains four hold-over episodes from the season 11 (BABF) production line. The showrunner for the twelfth production season was Mike Scully. The season won and was nominated for numerous awards including two Primetime Emmy Awards wins and an Annie Award. Season 12 was released on DVD in Region 1 on August 18, 2009, Region 2 on September 28, 2009, and Region 4 on September 2, 2009.

Production
The season's executive producer was once again Mike Scully, in his last season as executive producer, while it was produced by Gracie Films and 20th Century Fox Television. He later returned to the series in season fourteen as a writer and executive producer for the episode "How I Spent My Strummer Vacation". Mike Scully has stated his goal during his tenure was to "not wreck the show".

Don Payne, John Frink and Bob Bendetson began writing for the series, while Larry Doyle, Julie Thacker and Tom Martin left following the completion of this season. Rob LaZebnik received his first sole writing credit for the episode "Homer vs. Dignity". LaZebnik would not get a writing credit for another episode until the 20th season, where he was credited for writing "Father Knows Worst". Shaun Cashman received his sole directing credit on the series this season (for the 250th episode "A Tale of Two Springfields"), while Neil Affleck received his final directorial credit (also for "Homer vs. Dignity"). Tom Gammill and Max Pross have been promoted to produce this season. As of 2009, Gammill & Pross are still credited as such, along with David Mirkin. Mike Reiss (Al Jean's former writing partner) returned to the writing staff as a producer.

The season began with the annual Treehouse of Horror episode, beginning a practice of starting the season with the episodes, as well as airing the episodes shortly after Halloween in November, due to Fox's coverage of the World Series. This season brought back Sideshow Bob, who had not been seen since the eighth-season episode "Brother from Another Series". Ian Maxtone-Graham's episode "Tennis the Menace" became the second episode of the series to be animated using digital ink and paint, which had not been used since the season seven episode "Radioactive Man" and would not be used again (this time on a permanent basis) until the 14th season. The season would also have four episodes that would air the following season.

Reception

Critical reception
The twelfth season has received mostly positive reviews from critics. Matt Haigh of Den of Geek said that "The bad episodes are never really terrible, it's more that they're a bit boring and will most likely have you yawning 10 minutes in. With this in mind, season 12 ends up being very much a 50/50 affair". Nancy Basile gave a list of "Must See TV" episodes and "Not So Must See TV" episodes — with more of the former.

Awards

"HOMR" was nominated for various awards. Al Jean received a nomination for Primetime Emmy Award for Outstanding Animated Program (for Programming Less Than One Hour) the eleventh win for the series. Another Primetime Emmy Award nomination is for Primetime Emmy Award for Outstanding Music Composition for a Series. Another win for "HOMR" is an Annie Award for Outstanding Writing in an Animated Television Production. Other Primetime Emmy Awards nominations include Hank Azaria for "Worst Episode Ever". Lisa Simpson also won a Board of Directors Ongoing Commitment Award. The show also won at the 2002 Kids' Choice Awards.

Nielsen Rating
The season ranked 21st in the seasonal ratings with an average of 14.7 million viewers an episode, rising 6% from last season.

Episodes

Home media
The DVD boxset for season twelve was released by 20th Century Fox in the United States and Canada on Tuesday, August 18, 2009, eight years after it had completed broadcast on television. As well as every episode from the season, the DVD release feature bonus material including deleted scenes, animatics, and commentaries for every episode. The boxart features Comic Book Guy, and a special limited edition "embossed head case" package was also released.

References

Bibliography

External links
Season 12 at The Simpsons.com

Simpsons season 12
2000 American television seasons
2001 American television seasons